Tumi Je Aamar is a 1994 Bengali drama film directed by Inder Sen starring Ranjit Mallick, Anuradha Ray, Prosenjit Chatterjee, Satabdi Roy, Tapas Paul and Indrani Dutta in lead roles. The film has been music composed by Babul Bose.

Plot

The story begins with Arun Choudhury (Ranjit Mallick) and Sujata Choudhury (Anuradha Ray) as happy couple living together and leading a happy life with their son Suman (Tapas Paul). Arun Choudhury is a doctor by profession. One day, in his clinic comes Seema (Sanghamitra Bandyopadhyay) who was Arun's college best friend. Arun used to like her a lot during college. Arun and Sujata went to dinner that night along with Seema. Arun's best friend Avik (Ramaprasad Banik) had a very lovely romantic nature. He used to write poetry for his love life and always dreamt himself of as a romantic person. He used to be a regular visitor to Arun's clinic. On their wedding anniversary, Arun and Sujata invited Seema to their party where she seen Seema had a strong bond and liking towards Arun which she strongly opposed to. One fateful night, Seema's son died due to high fever and complications. Seema blamed Arun for all these as he was the sole doctor they were visiting. Frustrated, Arun reached his house and there ensued a strong quarrel between Arun and Sujata which led Sujata leave the house. Sujata was a pregnant woman and she decided to stay away from Arun. After few days, Sujata gave birth to a boy named Rahul (Prosenjit Chatterjee). Staying away for many years led Arun and Sujata feel deserted while Rahul and Suman grew up to be good friends. Upon recommended by Arun, Rahul got a job in Avik's industry where he started liking Soma (Satabdi Roy) whereas Suman started liking Riya (Indrani Dutta) after saving her from a gang of goons. After few days Suman and Riya married to each other and came to take blessings from Sujata unaware that she is none other than his biological mother. Sujata came to know that Suman is her son and hugged him. She ensured that Arun would agree to their marriage as Arun was not agreed to their relationship. Sujata and Arun met each other and said all things also telling him Rahul is their son, on which Arun got ecstatic and happy. Rahul and Soma also married to each other and were spending happy days until their family problems came to hinder their path when Suman started disobeying his father and Rahul started to live in his in-laws house with his wife leaving both of their parents alone. Finally, Arun and Sujata met each other and everything became good with all members again came upon rejoicing and thinking about the well-being of their parents. Everyone started living happily thereafter.

Cast
 Ranjit Mallick as Arun Choudhury
 Anuradha Ray as Sujata Choudhury
 Tapas Paul as Suman Choudhury
 Prosenjit Chatterjee as Rahul Choudhury
 Satabdi Roy as Soma Halder, Rahul's love interest
 Chinmoy Roy
 Indrani Dutta as Riya, Suman's love interest
 Shakuntala Barua as Joyeeta Halder, Soma's mother
 Sanghamitra Bandyopadhyay as Seema, Arun's college friend
 Anamika Saha
 Ramaprasad Banik as Avik Halder, Soma's father
 Debnath Chattopadhyay

Soundtrack
Music of this film has been composed by Babul Bose. Kumar Sanu, Udit Narayan, Asha Bhosle, Deepa Narayan, Abhijeet Bhattacharya and Kavita Krishnamurthy had given their voices for the songs.

Track listings 
 01. Jakhoni Thakbe Eka (Tumi Je Aamar) by Kumar Sanu
 02. Tomar Chokheri Kajole by Abhijeet Bhattacharya and Kavita Krishnamurthy
 03. Chokhta Valo by Kumar Sanu and Asha Bhosle
 04. Eso Tumi Buke Eso by Udit Narayan
 05. Bhoyete Keno Hoy by Kumar Sanu and Asha Bhosle
 06. Alo Nive Asa by Kumar Sanu and Deepa Narayan

Awards
BFJA Awards (1995):-
 Best Indian film  Tumi Je Aamar

References

External links
 Tumi Je Aamar at the Gomolo

1994 drama films
1994 films
Bengali-language Indian films
1990s Bengali-language films
Indian drama films
Films scored by Babul Bose